Mario Gentili  (31 January 1913 – 19 January 1999) was an Italian cyclist. He won the silver medal in Men's team pursuit at the 1936 Summer Olympics.

References

1913 births
1999 deaths
Italian male cyclists
Olympic silver medalists for Italy
Cyclists at the 1936 Summer Olympics
Olympic cyclists of Italy
Olympic medalists in cycling
People from Prato
Sportspeople from the Province of Prato
Medalists at the 1936 Summer Olympics
Cyclists from Tuscany